Cityarts Workshop was a nonprofit community mural arts organization incorporated in 1971. Cityarts Workshop often employed lead artists to work within various communities to create murals. In the 1970, Cityarts Workshop created several murals by and for communities of color, three of which were in Chinatown with lead artists Tomie Aria and Alan Okada.

History 
In 1968 the New York City Parks, Recreation, and Cultural Affairs Administration, now known as the New York City Department of Cultural Affairs, began a program called the New York City Community Arts Project. As its director they hired Susan Shapiro Kiok. In 1971, Susan incorporated CITYarts Workshop as a non-profit arts organization. Susan was inspired by the community mural work being done by Robert J. Fox (pastor)’s Summer in the City (city program) in 1967 in the New York neighborhoods of East Village, East Harlem, and South Bronx. Cityarts Workshop closed down in 1988 and was re-established as CITYarts, Inc. in 1989

People

Lead mural artists
Tomie Arai
Susan Caruso-Green
Maria Dominguez
Alfredo Hernandez
Lee Quiñones
James Jannuzzi
Alan Okada

References

External Links 

 Cityarts Workshop records (part of successor organization's CITYarts, Inc. records) at New-York Historical Society Library

1971 establishments in New York City
1988 disestablishments in New York (state)
Arts organizations based in New York City
American artist groups and collectives